Lorenzo Saporetti (born 19 March 1996) is an Italian footballer who plays as a defender for  club Pro Patria.

Club career
Saporetti made his Serie C debut for Parma on 5 November 2016 in a game against Gubbio.

On 29 August 2019, he signed with Catania.

On 3 September 2020, he moved to Pro Patria.

References

External links
 

1996 births
Living people
People from Forlì
Footballers from Emilia-Romagna
Italian footballers
Association football defenders
Serie C players
Serie D players
Parma Calcio 1913 players
Fermana F.C. players
A.C. Renate players
Catania S.S.D. players
Aurora Pro Patria 1919 players
Sportspeople from the Province of Forlì-Cesena